Shiravand or Shir Avand may refer to:

Places in Iran
 Shiravand, Hamadan, Hamadan Province
 Shiravand, Ilam, Ilam Province
 Shiravand, Rumeshkhan, in Rumeshkhan County, Lorestan Province
 Shiravand, Selseleh, in Selseleh County, Lorestan Province
 Keryeh-ye Abdolah Shiravand, Dowreh County, Lorestan Province
 Shiravand Gandabeh, Kuhdasht County, Lorestan Province
 Shiravand Naveh, Kuhdasht County, Lorestan Province
 Shiravand-e Olya, Kuhdasht County, Lorestan Province
 Shiravand-e Sofla, Kuhdasht County, Lorestan Province